Sanaz Minaie Persian: ساناز مینایی, Performing of the first cooking program in Islamic Republic of Iran Broadcasting by the title of "Sobhgahi Program" which was welcomed by all the audience; and then was resulted in repetition of that in afternoon in "Tasvir e Zendegi" program and producing 7 DVDs about the history and civilization of Iran in terms of food.
Performing and broadcasting cooking programs in "Aftab Channel" and for in international programs
Production, performance and propagation of educational DVDs confirmed by Ministry of Culture and Islamic Guidance; all the income earned was allocated to "Mahak, Society to support children suffering from cancer" (2009)
Expert in TV program naming "Dastpokht Khodemani in 2016. Minaie gave a talk at TEDxTehran about the history of Persian cousin.

Personal life
Sanaz Minaie was born in Arak city, and now is living in Tehran city. Her ex-name was Akram but she changed it to Sanaz due to her activities. She has two daughters naming Sanaz and Sania.

Career

Cooking Institute
The first Cooking Institute in Iran was established by Sanaz Minaie. Since 1978, she starts her work by teaching the arts like vegetable and fruit decoration, pastry making, cake decoration and family management. In 1991, developing 14 standards in terms of Cooking, pastry and hospitality under the title of Golden Chef, established the first culinary institute by permission from Iran Technical and Vocational Training Organization. She could get the permission for the establishment of non-profit university in the terms of knowledge and cooking from Ministry of Science, Research and Technology.

Publishing Books and Encyclopedias
Getting permission of publishing from Ministry of Culture and Islamic Guidance, 1998
Sanaz Minaie along with his two daughters, Sanaz and Sania, cooperated each other and produced a rich and full circulated magazine in the field of cooking in 2007. Also they have been publishing encyclopedias that up to now, two of them are ready to use. First one is about techniques of cooking and the second is Iranian Traditional Cooking.

TV Programs
Performing of the first cooking program in Islamic Republic of Iran Broadcasting by the title of "Sobhgahi Program" which was welcomed by all the audience; and then was resulted in repetition of that in afternoon in "Tasvir e Zendegi" program and producing 7 DVDs about the history and civilization of Iran in terms of food.
Performing and broadcasting cooking programs in "Aftab Channel" and for in international programs
Production, performance and propagation of educational DVDs confirmed by Ministry of Culture and Islamic Guidance; all the income earned was allocated to "Mahak, Society to support children suffering from cancer" (2009)
Expert in TV program naming "Dastpokht Khodemani in 2016
.

Exclusive Cooking and Pastry Magazine
SanazSania Magazine as the first expert Magazine in the field of Cooking and Pastry has been publishing 2007. Sanaz Sharifi, the older daughter is now Chief Editor of Magazine.

Invention Register
In 2012, Minaie managed to register invention of technology of preparation, control and standardization of Golden Chef. This standard was imparted, for the first time in national and world level in the field of food technology, in order to develop Iranian foods, preparation technology and ingredients control and hospitality manners, aiming to develop the tourism industry in the country, create required attractions for introduction of Iranian original culture, promote knowledge and scientific education of modern cooking ways, increase individual knowledge level in the field of safety and hygiene and environmental issues for preparing ingredients and finally introduction of hospitality etiquette and other related fields.

Other Activities
Expert of forty-second world professional skills Olympiad in the field of cooking and pastry (Germany, 2013)
Managing and training the hosts in sixteenth Movement of Non-Aligned Summit (Tehran, 2012)
In charge of preparation and welcoming in sixteenth Movement of Non-Aligned Summit (Tehran, 2012)
Judge and executive expert of thirteenth national vocational skills Olympiad in the field of cooking and pastry (Iran, 2012)
One of the four international judges (America, South Korea, France and Iran) in world food festival (South Korea, 2010)
cooperation in producing and broadcasting the first educational pastry art in Islamic Republic of Iran Broadcasting for 5 years (1993)
production, performance and propagation of 7 videotapes and more than 10  educational CDs in the field of cooking and pastry art, confirmed by Ministry of Ershad
constant and dynamic cooperation with Tehran Municipal Office of Women's Affairs for presenting job creation plans focusing on Iranian ladies
performing cooking plans in Aftab Channel for broadcasting in USA TV and 7 European Countries in 1995
secretary of first Healthy Diet Congress
Education of cooking in Javanan Magazine
Education of cooking in Etelaat Haftegi weekly magazine
Education of cooking in Danestaniha Magazine
Cooperation in holding international Zeytoon Congress
Chairman of the Board of Commerce Commission of Entrepreneurial Women's Club
Consulting, Monitoring, Managing, Training and Promoting the level of Chefs and Stewardess in the field of hospitality and formalities in CIP section of Imam Khomeini International Airport

Honors
Select judgment in Invention Festival in Tehran and Alborz Provinces (2014)
Getting Golden Statue Management and National competent director plate from deputy Minister of Industry, Mine and Trade by time, Mrs, Shoeila Jelodarzadeh
Getting Top Media Statue from Premio Sicilia of Italy (2011)
Getting eminence in "Vegetables and Fruit Decoration" tournament in Tokyo, Japan, 1986
Getting first rank in Cooking Festival in France in 1988
Getting Golden Statue of an Elected Global Assembly as the first and only Iranian lady (Tehran, 1391)
Getting the title of excellent founder and manager of private institutes from Iran Technical and Vocational Training Organization, 2011 - 2012

Publications
Sanaz Sania; Cooking Encyclopedia (2014), now in 3 volumes
SanazSania Cooking (2007) in 2 volumes
All kind of Polo with Easy Cooking (2007)
Fish and Sea Foods (2006)
Fantasy Breads (2006)
Cooking with Gouda Cheese (2006)
All kind of Toast Sandwiches (2006)
Sanaz Sania Meat Foods (2005)
All kind of Ice creams (2005)
All kind of International Desserts (2005)
All kind of Traditional Desserts, Jams and Marmalades (2005)
Vegetable and Fruit Decoration (2005) in 3 volumes
Vegetable and Food Decoration (2005)
All kind of Macaroni (pasta, lasagna and spaghetti) (2004)
All kind of Fish (2004)
All kind of Chicken and Poultry (2004)
All kind of Rice and Polo (2004)
All kind Pizzas (2004)
All kind of Stews (2004)
All kind of Sauces (2004)
All kind of Kebabs (2004)
All kind of Cakes (2004)
Sanaz Sania Cooking Book (2003)
Traditional Cookies and all kind of Chocolates (2002)
Modern Cookies and all kind of Biscuits (2002)

Other issue
Having the permission of the establishment of scientific and non-profit university.
Having professional and exclusive photography atelier
Offering catering with the newest traditional and modern finger foods and offering direct cooking services
Offering Learning Management System (LMS)
Getting the first rank in courses of bread, cooking and confectionary from countries like France, Japan and Arabian United Emirate in 1990-1991
Setting Agreement Contract with Technical and Vocational Training Organization in order to educate and promote instructors of all the institutes in the country
Being observer of Food Olympia in Iran and judge and expert in World Olympia in Germany, 2013
Being one of the four world judges (America, South Korea, Iran and France) in World Cooking Festival in South Korea, 2010
Getting Global Assembly Elected as the first and only lady in promoting Iranian Food Culture
Observing on the hospitality manner of Foreign Affairs Ministry in 2010
Being observer and Manager of Non-Aligned summit in 2012
Developing 17 Standards for Technical and Vocational Training Organization in 2012
Getting gold status of Global Assembly Elected as first and only Iranian lady, Tehran, 2012
Getting the position of "Founder and Privilege Manager of Private Institutes" from Technical and Vocational Training Organization in 2012
Performing more than 100 Exclusive Exhibitions and Congresses for Food 
Being Executive Judge and Expert for 13th Technical and Vocational National Olympia in the field of Cooking and Confectionary, Iran, 2012
Introducing hospitality manner, culture and civilization of Iranian to other countries and cooperating with ambassadors of 27 countries as cultural ambassador of Iran
Cooperation contract with Education and Training Organization for educating to students in the field of special jobs
Participating in more than 54 interior and exterior Exhibition related to Cooking
Holding more than 15 Cooking Competition courses in order to spread Iranian Cuisine among ladies and granting awards like Gold, Silver and Bronze Medals
Being member of Elite Managers Club
Being Selected in Iranian Experts Assembly
Entrepreneur Elite Lady
Reference Lady of Iranian Cooking
Consulting, education and startup of hotels
Free education to culture centers in order to promoting art of cooking and confectionary level
Constant and dynamic cooperation with women affair section of Tehran Municipality by offering job creating plans to Iranian ladies
Constant and dynamic cooperation with media and magazines in the field of family and life style
Designing phone system on the title of Emdad Honar in order to respond the question in the field of cooking for 12 hours of the day

Courses and Certificates
Getting Ph.D. certificate in course of Business Management from Liberty University of united states in 2015
Getting M.B.A with high rank in working
Getting more than 30 certificates in the field of food and drink from Technical and Vocational Training Organization
Getting certificate of Confectionary Master from Technical and Vocational Training Organization in 1989
Getting certificate of Cooking Master Chef from Technical and Vocational Training Organization in 1989
Getting Cordon Bleu from London
Getting certificate in the field of "professional Cake Decoration" from England /Rosalind Miller Wedding Cakes/London/2012
Getting certificate in the field of "professional Cake flowers" from England –/ Cakes 4 Fun schools of sugar crafts / London/ 2012 
Getting certificate in the field of "Art of Chocolate Making" from Arabian United Emirate International Center for Culinary Arts/ Dubai/ 2012
Getting certificate in the field of international Cuisine including: Moroccan, Chinese, French, Indian, Japanese, Mediterranean, Greek, Mexican, *Lebanese and Italian Cooking from Arabian United Emirate, International Center for Culinary Arts Dubai / City & Guilds / 2012
Getting certificate in the field of "Bread Making" from United States of America, Bates Technical College Tacoma, Washington/ 1995
Getting certificate in the field of Food and Drink Management from Technical and Vocational Train Organization, 2011
Getting certificate of the International Conference on Change Management, Communications Skills and Inspirational Leadership / Tehran / 2008
Getting Sicilian Award of Italy for Exquisite Books in 2011

Charity Activities
Production, performance and publishing educational DVDs public works with Italian Embassy confirmed by Ministry of Culture and Islamic Guidance which its revenue was devoted to "Mahak" institute (2009)
Constant and dynamic cooperation with women affair section of Tehran Municipality by offering job creating plans with the base of household ladies
Active presence in Kahrizak Charity Foundation
Cooperation with Fateme Zahra Charity Foundation
Help to hold Ra'ad Charity in favor of Children with Cancer
Environment activist in the field of fighting against plastic disposable dishes
Member of Khalij Fars Charity in favor of Children with Cancer

References

External links
  

Iranian women writers
Iranian chefs
Women cookbook writers
Women food writers